Jackson County Courthouse is a historic courthouse located at Brownstown, Jackson County, Indiana.  The original building was built in 1870, and extensively remodeled by Elmer E. Dunlap in the Classical Revival style in 1911. It is a two-story, brick and limestone building consisting of a rectangular main central section with two flanking wings. The building features a four-sided clock tower. Located on the courthouse grounds are the contributing Sherman M-4 memorial tank, the town water pump and bell, and a cast iron fence (1872).

It was listed on the National Register of Historic Places in 2011.

References

Clock towers in Indiana
County courthouses in Indiana
Courthouses on the National Register of Historic Places in Indiana
Neoclassical architecture in Indiana
Government buildings completed in 1911
Buildings and structures in Jackson County, Indiana
National Register of Historic Places in Jackson County, Indiana